Rafael Moreno Valle (August 13, 1917 – February 13, 2016) was a Mexican military physician and politician.  A member of PRI, he served as the Governor of Puebla from 1969 to 1974, as well as the Secretary of Health from 1964 to 1968 under President Gustavo Díaz Ordaz. He was also a founding member of the Sociedad Mexicana de Traumatología y Ortopedia.

Moreno was the grandfather of Rafael Moreno Valle Rosas, who served as the Governor of Puebla from 2011 to 2018.

Biography
Moreno Valle was born in the city of Atlixco, Puebla, on August 13, 1917. He completed his early schooling in Atlixco. He graduated from Escuela Médico Militar, the Mexican Army medical school, in 1940. He then worked at the Carrie Tingley Hospital in the U.S. state of New Mexico from 1941 to 1942. He then became the first Mexican to serve as a chief resident at Charity Hospital in New Orleans, Louisiana. He studied at Tulane University, beginning in 1945, where he specialized on orthopedics.

Moreno Valle taught as an adjunct profession of Trauma and Orthopedics at the Escuela Médico Militar, as well as the Escuela Militar de Enfermería. He was appointed the director of the Hospital Central Militar Mexico in 1946.< In 1952, he rose to the rank of brigadier general.

In 1958, Moreno was elected to the Senate of the Republic from the state of Puebla. He served in the XLIV  and XLV Legislatures of Mexico from 1958 to 1964. Moreno Valle was appointed federal Secretary of Health under President Gustavo Díaz Ordaz from 1964 to 1968.

Moreno Valle, a member of the ruling PRI party, served as the Governor of Puebla from 1969 to 1972.

In 2015, the National Public Health Council of Mexico awarded Moreno Valle the Mérito Médico Guillermo Soberón Acevedo de Desarrollo de Instituciones award. That same year, the Hospital de Traumatología y Ortopedia of Puebla added his name to the institution in recognition of his service to the hospital.

Rafael Moreno Valle died on February 13, 2016, at his home in the Chimalistac neighborhood of Mexico City at the age of 98.

References

1917 births
2016 deaths
Governors of Puebla
Mexican Secretaries of Health
Members of the Senate of the Republic (Mexico)
Presidents of the Senate of the Republic (Mexico)
Mexican military doctors
Mexican orthopedic surgeons
Politicians from Puebla
Institutional Revolutionary Party politicians
Mexican expatriates in the United States
People from Atlixco
20th-century Mexican politicians
20th-century Mexican physicians
20th-century Mexican military personnel
20th-century surgeons